Dakpadou is a town in southern Ivory Coast. It is a sub-prefecture of Sassandra Department in Gbôklé Region, Bas-Sassandra District.

Dakpadou was a commune until March 2012, when it became one of 1126 communes nationwide that were abolished.

In 2014, the population of the sub-prefecture of Dakpadou was 46,529.

Villages
The 14 villages of the sub-prefecture of Dakpadou and their population in 2014 are:

References

Sub-prefectures of Gbôklé
Former communes of Ivory Coast